Quarff is a small village on Mainland in the Shetland Islands in Scotland. The village is spread along a classic glacial valley that runs east–west across the island between high hills to north and south, with centres of population at Easter Quarff which is near the main road and the east coast, and Wester Quarff which is 1 miles (2.4 km) west and faces the Atlantic Ocean. A narrow road runs along the valley between the two.

History
The name "Quarff" comes from Old Norse "Hvervi" and means a bending shape(John Stewart - Shetland Place-names Page 175).  The north hill does indeed have a bend shape. The village has long been a site where goods and boats could be transported between the east and west coast, avoiding what would otherwise be a sea journey of about  round Sumburgh Head. Sir John Sinclair reported in 1794 that "The people of Quarff are frequently employed in transporting goods from one side of the country to the other, which brings them in considerable sums."

In 1830, when the church was built, the villagers were reported to be mostly sea fishermen, catching cod, ling and herring. They also cultivated small patches of land, growing potatoes and corn.

There is evidence of Stone Age occupation in the area. In 1900 a local crofter excavated a mound on his croft and found a stone slab covering a stone-lined chamber containing a skull and a bowl. Similar chambers were found in the locality.

Population
In recent years the population of Quarff has increased. Twenty-five years ago, Easter Quarff had 12 crofts and 28 houses; by 2004 there were over 70 dwellings. Wester Quarff, however, has remained fairly constant with thirteen dwellings in small clusters.

Infrastructure
The Quarff water supply is from the Sandy Loch reservoir at Lerwick. There is currently no mains drainage in Quarff; each property has its own septic tank.

Regular buses between Sumburgh Airport and Lerwick pass through Easter Quarff.

Quarff has a community hall used for youth clubs, play groups, as a venue during the folk festival and for other events.

Quarff church

Quarff Government church and manse in Easter Quarff were completed in 1830, to a design by Thomas Telford. In 1843 his allegiance was called into question however, and in June 1843 his name appears in a list of ministers who had given their adhesion to the Free Presbyterian Church in Scotland in the so-called Disruption of 1843. The "parish living" in Quarff became vacant and the Rev. Alexander Webster was appointed on 31 July 1843.

The church was described in 1845 as "a beautiful and commodious building built to contain 320." The area experienced a Christian revival in 1863; a contemporaneous report reads: "Formerly Quarff was noted for its coldness and apathy in matters of religion ... Now, however, the people are in the deepest concern about the interests of their souls".

The church is no longer in use; services are held in the Old Manse on the Lerwick Road each Sunday at 11:30 am. The churchyard is well maintained, however, and is still used for burials.

Education
The Quarff Primary School catered for local children in the 5 to 12 age range, and was open from 1879 until it was closed by the council in 2003. In 2001 the school won an award from the National Association for Gallery Education for a long-term art project involving the whole school (12 pupils with teacher Anne Halford-MacLeod), Bonhoga Gallery and artist Ruth Brownlee.

The number of pupils decreased from a peak of 25 in 1987 to only 12 in 2001, thought to be a result of parents working in Lerwick taking their children to Lerwick schools. When the teacher moved to Cunningsburgh School in 2003 the school was closed and the pupils were transferred to the school in Cunningsburgh  to the south. School transport is available.

The nearest secondary schooling is at Sandwick or Lerwick.

Gallery

References

External links

Canmore - Easter Quarff Cist site record

Villages in Mainland, Shetland